Camilo Andrés Melivilú Fuentes (born 8 September 1993) is a Chilean professional footballer who plays as a forward for Primera B de Chile club Rangers.

References
 
 

1993 births
Living people
Chilean people of Mapuche descent
Mapuche sportspeople
Indigenous sportspeople of the Americas
Footballers from Santiago
Chilean footballers
Association football forwards
Audax Italiano footballers
Deportes Copiapó footballers
Unión San Felipe footballers
Coquimbo Unido footballers
San Luis de Quillota footballers
San Marcos de Arica footballers
Deportes Magallanes footballers
Deportes Puerto Montt footballers
Rangers de Talca footballers
Chilean Primera División players
Primera B de Chile players